Andrés de la Cuesta (died 1564) was a Roman Catholic prelate who served as Bishop of León (1557–1564).

Biography
On 10 December 1557, Andrés de la Cuesta was appointed during the papacy of Pope Paul IV as Bishop of León. In 1558, he was consecrated bishop. He served as Bishop of León until his death in 1564.

References

External links and additional sources
 (for Chronology of Bishops) 
 (for Chronology of Bishops) 

16th-century Roman Catholic bishops in Spain
1564 deaths
Bishops appointed by Pope Paul IV